New Hampshire's 2nd State Senate district is one of 24 districts in the New Hampshire Senate. It has  been represented by Republican Timothy Lang Sr. since 2022.

Geography
District 2 covers parts of Belknap, Grafton, and Merrimack Counties in the center of the state. The district includes the towns of Center Harbor, Meredith, New Hampton, Sanbornton, and Tilton in Belknap County; Alexandria, Ashland, Bridgewater, Bristol, Campton, Dorchester, Ellsworth, Grafton, Groton, Haverhill, Hebron, Holderness, Orange, Orford, Piermont, Plymouth, Rumney, Warren, and Wentworth in Grafton County; and Danbury, Hill, and Wilmot in Merrimack County.

The district is split between New Hampshire's 1st congressional district and New Hampshire's 2nd congressional district. It borders the state of Vermont.

Recent election results

2022

Elections prior to 2022 were held under different district lines.

Historical election results

2020

2018

2016

2014

2012

Federal and statewide results in District 2

References

2
Belknap County, New Hampshire
Grafton County, New Hampshire
Merrimack County, New Hampshire